Mulan or Hua Mulan is a legendary figure from ancient China said to have taken her father's place in the army.

Mulan may also refer to:

Entertainment
Mulan (2009 film), a 2009 film starring Vicky Zhao and Chen Kun
Lady General Hua Mu-lan, a 1964 film

Disney Princess media franchise
Mulan (franchise), a Disney media franchise
Mulan (1998 film), a 1998 Disney animated film based on the legendary figure Hua Mulan
Disney's Mulan (video game), 1998 Game Boy game, made by THQ studio NewKidCo, based on the first film
Disney's Animated Storybook: Mulan, a 1998 video game for Windows and Macintosh computers developed by Media Station and published by Disney Interactive, ported to PlayStation the following year by Revolution Software as Disney's Story Studio: Mulan
Mulan Jr., a one-stage musical
Mulan II, a 2004 Disney direct-to-video sequel to Mulan
Mulan (2020 film), a live-action remake of Mulan

Soundtracks
 Mulan (soundtrack), a 1998 soundtrack to the Disney animated film
 Mulan (2020 soundtrack), a 2020 soundtrack to the Disney film live-action remake

Fictional characters
Mulan (Disney character), the title character of the Disney 1998 film and associated media
Mulan, a recurring character in the television series Once Upon a Time
Yao Mulan, the female protagonist in Lin Yutang's novel Moment in Peking

Plants
Magnolia liliiflora, Mulan magnolia

People
Ruth Mulan Chu Chao (born Zhu Mulan)
Huang Mulan
Mulan Jameela

Places
Mulan, Iran, a village in East Azerbaijan Province, Iran
Mulan Rural District, in East Azerbaijan Province, Iran 
Mulan County, Heilongjiang, China
Mulan, Huangpi, township in Huangpi District, Wuhan, China
Mulan River, in Fujian, China
Mulan Community, Western Australia

Other uses 

 MG Mulan, an electric car
 Tropical Storm Mulan, a 2022 Pacific typhoon

See also

 Hua Mulan (disambiguation)
 Mulan Joins the Army (disambiguation)